Lokotown and Other Stories is a collection of nine short stories by Nigerian author Cyprian Ekwensi, published in 1966 as the 19th volume in the African Writers Series. Looking at Nigerian city life, his stories show excitement and dissolution.

References

British Empire in fiction
1966 short story collections
Heinemann (publisher) books
African Writers Series
Nigerian short story collections
Nigeria in fiction